Holocaust are a Scottish heavy metal band founded in 1977 and based in Edinburgh.

Influenced by Black Sabbath, Judas Priest, Motörhead, AC/DC, UFO, Led Zeppelin, Rush and Budgie, the current lineup is John Mortimer guitar and vocals, Scott Wallace drums and Mark McGrath bass. Original lineup featured guitarists John Mortimer and Ed Dudley, vocalist Gary Lettice, bassist Robin Begg and drummer Nick Brockie. In 1983, guitar player Ed Dudley left the band, forming and releasing an album under the moniker Hologram. Holocaust was one of the premier Scottish bands in the new wave of British heavy metal scene in the late 1970s and early 1980s, deviating from the more commercial new wave music of the day, and combining earlier metal with the tempo and attitude of punk rock.

The John Mortimer-led Holocaust incorporated many progressive metal, thrash metal and post-punk influences into its sound, releasing complex pieces such as the "Sound of Souls" EP and concept album Covenant. The band's current three-piece lineup has remained the same since 2003, releasing the EP "Expander" and the album Predator in 2015, and most recently the album "Elder Gods" in 2019.

Holocaust's best known song remains "The Small Hours", which Metallica covered in 1987 and it was released on their The $5.98 E.P. - Garage Days Re-Revisited EP, and reappeared on their 1998 compilation album Garage Inc.

Discography

Albums 
 The Nightcomers (1981)
 Steal the Stars (1983) released under the name 'Hologram'
 No Man's Land (1984)
 The Sound of Souls (1989)
 Hypnosis of Birds (1992)
 Spirits Fly (1996)
 Covenant (1997)
 The Courage to Be (2000)
 Primal (2003)
 Predator (2015)
 Elder Gods (2019)

Live albums 
 Live (Hot Curry & Wine) (1983)

EPs and singles 
 "Heavy Metal Mania" (1980, 7-inch)
 Heavy Metal Mania (1980, 12-inch)
 "Smokin' Valves" (1980, 7-inch)
 Smokin' Valves (1980, 12-inch)
 Live from the Raw Loud 'n' Live Tour (1981, 7-inch)
 Comin' Through (1982, 12-inch)
 Heavy Metal Mania '93 (1993, CD)
 Expander (2013, CD)

Compilations 
 NWOBHM '79 Revisited (1990)
 Smokin' Valves: The Anthology (2003)

Videos 
 Live from the Raw Loud 'n' Live Tour (1981, VHS; 2004, DVD)

Cover versions 
 Metallica covered the song "The Small Hours" (as above).
 Gamma Ray covered the song "Heavy Metal Mania" on their 1996 live album Alive '95. There was also a studio version released as a bonus song with their 1995 album Land of the Free. In 2013, Gamma Ray recorded the song "Death or Glory" for their EP "Master of Confusion".
 Six Feet Under covered the song "Death or Glory" from The Nightcomers album on their 1997 Warpath record.

See also 
List of new wave of British heavy metal bands

References

External links 

 Holocaust – Encyclopaedia Metallum: The Metal Archives

Scottish rock music groups
Scottish heavy metal musical groups
British progressive metal musical groups
Musical groups established in 1977
Musical groups disestablished in 1983
Musical groups reestablished in 1984
Musical groups disestablished in 1984
Musical groups reestablished in 1988
Musical quartets
New Wave of British Heavy Metal musical groups